Folly Castle Historic District, also known as the West Washington Street Historic District, is a national historic district located at Petersburg, Virginia. The district includes 189 contributing buildings and 1 contributing object located in a predominantly residential section of Petersburg. It includes a varied collection of late 18th-and 19th-century houses and includes notable examples of Late Victorian, Georgian, Italianate, Queen Anne, and Federal style architecture.  Notable buildings include Folly Castle / Peter Jones V residence (1763, 1865-1885), McIlwaine-Friend residence (1856-1858), Rambout-Donnan residence (c. 1780-1790), former Petersburg High School (1917-1918), Donnan House (c. 1810), First Baptist Church (1928), Couch House (1850s), and St. John's Episcopal Church (1897).  Located in the district and separately listed are the Second Presbyterian Church and Strawberry Hill.

It was listed on the National Register of Historic Places in 1980, with boundary increases in 1992 and 2000.

References

Historic districts on the National Register of Historic Places in Virginia
Georgian architecture in Virginia
Federal architecture in Virginia
Victorian architecture in Virginia
Italianate architecture in Virginia
Queen Anne architecture in Virginia
Buildings and structures in Petersburg, Virginia
National Register of Historic Places in Petersburg, Virginia